Kent Hills Wind Farm is a large wind farm project located southeast from Prosser Brook, New Brunswick. The wind farm was completed in three phases between 2008 and 2018. The farm was the first in New Brunswick. It is owned and operated by TransAlta and the power is purchased by NB Power for supply to consumers.

As of 2021, the farm consisted of forty-nine 3-megawatt (MW) wind turbines and 5 3.45-MW turbines, for a total capacity of 167 MW. The project produces 580,000 megawatt hours per year.

In October 2021 a tower, in phase two of the project, collapsed because of a bad foundation. Initially all WTG were taken off line as a precaution. TransAlta Renewables have found deficiencies in the design of all of the windmill foundations. Costs to replace them are quoted to be 75-100 million dollars. 

It is the largest wind farm in Atlantic Canada.

See also

List of wind farms in Canada

References

Wind farms in New Brunswick
Buildings and structures in Albert County, New Brunswick